The Soesdyke-Linden Highway is a  2-lane highway that runs between Soesdyke and Linden in Guyana. The East Bank Public Road connects Soesdyke with Georgetown.

Construction

The Soesdyke-Linden highway was constructed between 1966 and 1968 by B.B. Mc. Cormick & Sons. It cost approximately US$17 million to build. The highway was officially opened in 1969.  The Soesdyke-Linden Highway was constructed as one phase of a highway connecting Georgetown with Lethem. A feasibility study for such a highway was done by a US consulting firm, Metcalf and Eddy, in 1961.

Continuing work 
The highway was rehabilitated in 1997–1999 with funding from the Caribbean Development Bank. The repair works were carried out by a Trinidadian company called Seereeram Brothers Ltd at a cost of US$6,575,000. The repair works included: overlaying the stretch between Soesdyke and Kuru Kururu with Asphalt concrete and sealing the rest of the road with a thin coat of asphalt and fine aggregate. The super structures of the bridges, which were of greenheart, were reconstructed with Reinforced concrete to a higher standard of live load.

The highway greatly improved development of the town of Linden, which was previously accessed by boat via the Demerara River.

Accidents are common, the highway is unlit and lacks regular maintenance.

References

Road transport in Guyana